The 15th Annual Young Hollywood Awards were held on Thursday, August 1, 2013, in Los Angeles, California, previously recorded the day before. Aisha Tyler was the host. While there were no nominees that year, the recipients were "honored" with the awards. This was the first year that the awards were televised.

Winners and nominees

See also

 List of American television awards

References

Young Hollywood Awards
Young Hollywood Awards 2013
Young Hollywood Awards 2013